Speak To Me is a studio album released by Christian singer and songwriter Geoff Moore. The album was released by Rocketown Records on April 3, 2007.

Track listing

 "Speak to Me" (Jim Cooper, Phillip LaRue) - 4:09
 "Your Day" (Joel Hanson, Moore) - 3:48
 "When I Get Where I'm Going (Rivers Rutherford, George Teren) - 4:43
 "Captured" (Hanson) - 4:04
 "Every Single One" (Ben Glover, Moore) - 4:24
 "He Knows My Name" (Tommy Walker) - 4:55
 "That's What Love Will Do" (Glover, Moore) - 4:05
 "This Is My Father's World" (Maltbie D. Babcock) - 4:41
 "So Long, Farewell (The Blessing)" (Moore, Dana Weaver) - 4:17
 "Erase" (Sam Mizell, Moore) / "Every Single One [Full Band Version]" (hidden track) - 10:19

Personnel
 Geoff Moore – lead vocals, backing vocals (2, 4, 5, 7, 8, 10)
 Ryan Tallent – keyboards, programming, bass and backing vocals (1, 3, 6, 9, 10)
 Ian Fitchuk – keyboards (2, 4, 5, 7, 8, 10)
 Blair Masters – keyboards (2, 4, 5, 7, 8, 10)
 Dwayne Larring – acoustic guitar, electric guitar and backing vocals (1, 3, 6, 9, 10)
 Dana Weaver – acoustic guitar (1, 3, 6, 9, 10), guitar (2, 4, 5, 7, 8, 10), backing vocals (2, 4, 5, 7, 8, 10)
 Adam Lester – guitar and backing vocals (2, 4, 5, 7, 8, 10)
 Chris Wiegel – bass (2, 4, 5, 7, 8, 10)
 David Larring – drums and additional programming (1)
 Aaron Sterling – drums and percussion (1, 3, 6, 9, 10)
 Paul Eckberg – drums (2, 4, 5, 7, 8, 10)
 Bruce Wethy – fiddle (2, 4, 5, 7, 8, 10)
 Kevin Perry – backing vocals (2, 4, 5, 7, 8, 10)
 Christy Nockels – duet and backing vocals (3)
 Nathan Nockels – backing vocals (3)
 Kendall Payne – duet and backing vocals (6)

Awards

The album was nominated for a Dove Award for Inspirational Album of the Year at the 39th GMA Dove Awards.

Chart performance

The song "When I Get Where I'm Going" peaked at No. 14 on Billboard's Christian Songs chart.

References

2007 albums